Gregory C. Beroza (born October 10, 1959) is a seismologist and the Wayne Loel Professor of Earth Sciences at Stanford University. He is also the Co-Director of the Southern California Earthquake Center. He was elected to the fellow of American Geophysical Union in 2008. He was elected a member of the National Academy of Sciences in 2022.

Education and Early Career 
Gregory obtained his Bachelor's degree from University of California, Santa Cruz in 1982 and his PhD degree from MIT in 1989. He became a faculty in Stanford geophysics in 1990 after being a post-doc researcher at MIT.

Research

Fingerprint And Similarity Thresholding (FAST) 
The Fingerprint And Similarity Thresholding algorithm was developed by Beroza group to "efficiently detect previously overlooked microquakes". This method can analyze week-long seismic information in less than 2 hours, 140 times faster than the traditional autocorrelation method. Furthermore, the new technique would help better monitor and categorize earthquakes.

Human-induced Earthquakes 
Greg's team measured stress drops in a number of human-induced and natural earthquakes in central US. They found the ground motions in induced and natural earthquakes are largely the same. The results suggest the ground motion prediction equations can be also applied to human-induced earthquakes and can be used to reduce the earthquake hazards in central US.

Awards 

 2021 The Alexander von Humboldt Foundation Research Award 
2021 AGU Beno Gutenberg Lecture
 2014 AGU Fellow
 1991 NSF Presidential Young Investigator Award

Partial bibliography
 Beroza, G. C., & Jordan, T. H. (1991). Rupture histories of the 1934 and 1966 Parkfield, California, earthquakes: a test of the characteristic earthquake hypothesis. Stanford, CA: The University. OCLC 32080287
 Beroza, G. C. (1995). Seismic source modeling (95RG00736). Reviews of Geophysics. 33, 299. ISSN 8755-1209 OCLC 89600682
 Beroza, G. C. (1997). "Earthquake Seismology". Geotimes. 42 (2), 53. ISSN 0016-8556 OCLC 87304084
 Beroza, G. C. (2003). Fault segmentation and possible pore fluid effects in the 1992 Landers, California aftershock sequence. Stanford, CA: Dept. of Geophysics, Stanford University. OCLC 	57190036
 Beroza, G. C., & Bokelmann, G. H. R. (2002). Constraints on crustal and fault-zone rheology from earthquake mechanisms. Stanford, CA: Dept. of Geophysics, Stanford University. OCLC 57244579

See also 

 Two earthquakes shook southern California this week. More could come, but predicting them isn’t easy.
 https://profiles.stanford.edu/gregory-beroza

References

1959 births
Stanford University Department of Geophysics faculty
American seismologists
Living people
Members of the United States National Academy of Sciences